Jack Taylor (1887 – May 19, 1956) was a Canadian successful amateur and professional wrestler. Considered to be Canada's first great wrestling superstar in his time he was the childhood idol of wrestling icon Stu Hart and trained Toots Mondt.

Biography

Championships and accomplishments

Amateur Wrestling 
 Canadian Heavyweight Championship

Professional Wrestling 
Canadian Wrestling Hall of Fame
Class of 2016
Stampede Wrestling
Stampede Wrestling Hall of Fame (Class of 1995)

References

External links
 Jack Taylor, at Wrestlingdata.com

1887 births
1956 deaths
Canadian male professional wrestlers
Professional wrestling trainers
Professional wrestlers from Ontario